Gaav Gata Gajali is an Indian Marathi language television series that aired on Zee Marathi. It was produced by Sunil Bhosale under the banner of Sajari Creations. The series premiered on 2 August 2017 by replacing Chuk Bhul Dyavi Ghyavi.

Seasons

Cast 
 Pralhad Kudtarkar
 Shubhangi Bhujbal
 Deepali Jadhav
 Asmita Khatkhate
 Rohan Surve
 Rohan Kotekar
 Rohit Kotekar
 Digambar Naik
 Kishor Ravrane
 Bharat Sawale

Ratings

References

External links 
 
 Gaav Gata Gajali at ZEE5

Marathi-language television shows
2017 Indian television series debuts
Zee Marathi original programming
2018 Indian television series endings